The 1999 Exxon Superflo 12 Hours of Sebring was the 47th running of the 12 Hours of Sebring.  It also served as the first event in the new American Le Mans Series, which had replaced the IMSA GT Championship as the International Motor Sports Association's premiere series.  It took place at Sebring International Raceway, Florida, on March 20, 1999.

Race results
Class winners in bold.

Statistics
 Pole Position - #42 BMW Motorsport - 1:49.850
 Fastest Lap - #0 Team Rafanelli - 1:51.608
 Distance - 
 Average Speed -

References

Sebring
12 Hours of Sebring
12 Hours of Sebring
12 Hours Of Sebring
12 Hours Of Sebring